The following is the complete list of awards and nominations received by 2001 film To the Left of the Father.

References

External links
 

To The Left of the Father